The 1978 Queen's Club Championships, also known by its sponsored name Rawlings International, was a men's tennis tournament played on outdoor grass courts at the Queen's Club in London in the United Kingdom that was part of the 1978 Colgate-Palmolive Grand Prix circuit. It was the 76th edition of the tournament and was held from 19 June through 24 June 1978. Unseeded Tony Roche won the singles title.

Finals

Singles

 Tony Roche defeated  John McEnroe 8–6, 9–7
 It was Roche's 2nd title of the year and the 26th of his career.

Doubles

 Bob Hewitt /  Frew McMillan defeated  Fred McNair /  Raúl Ramírez 6–2, 7–5
 It was Hewitt's 5th title of the year and the 50th of his career. It was McMillan's 5th title of the year and the 54th of his career.

References

External links
 ITF tournament edition details
 ATP tournament profile

 
Queen's Club Championships
Queen's Club Championships
Queen's Club Championships
Queen's Club Championships
Queen's Club Championships